Lasianthus ciliatus is a species of plant in the family Rubiaceae. It is endemic to Tamil Nadu in India.

References

ciliatus
Flora of Tamil Nadu
Vulnerable plants
Taxonomy articles created by Polbot